The Transformers was an 80-issue American comic book series published by Marvel Comics telling the story of the Transformers. Originally scheduled as a four-issue miniseries, it spawned a mythology that would inform other versions of the saga. It also had a UK sister title that spliced original stories into the continuity, running for 332 issues.

US title

Story arcs
There were several story arcs that ran through the U.S. series.

Issues # 1-4 - The Autobots and Decepticons land on Earth via the Ark, paralleling the cartoon. The Autobots are reformatted by the Ark to resemble cars and trucks; the Decepticons take the form of jets, weapons or in the case of Soundwave, a cassette deck with tapes.

The Decepticons wreak havoc, steal energy and build a fortress. The Autobots, seen here as very weak underdogs, unsuited for war, fight valiantly to stop their foes.

Ultimately, it is the humans that the Autobots befriend that save the day. Buster Witwicky's father, captured by the Decepticons to formulate a fuel for them, secretly poisons his captors.

In the final battle, five Autobots take on the entire Decepticon army. With the Autobots on the cusp of defeat, the tainted fuel concocted by Mr. Witwicky kicks in and the Decepticons fall.

The Autobots do not even have time to celebrate, however, as the four-part miniseries ends with Shockwave making an appearance, blowing the remaining Autobots to pieces. This cliffhanger led directly into the monthly Marvel run, which began three months after the miniseries ended (issue #4 had a cover date of March 1985; while issue #5 had a date of June). The series was originally intended to end after issue #4 and the planned last page of issue #4 indicated as much, but with strong sales, Marvel was convinced to make the series ongoing and the ending was altered to have Shockwave show up and attack the Autobots prior to the issue being published.

The series was also set in the Marvel Universe at one point with the X-Men's Dazzler is referenced in Issue #2 as well as Spider-Man, Joe Robertson and Nick Fury and Dum Dum Dugan of S.H.I.E.L.D. making appearances as early as issue #3. Additionally, the Savage Land appears in issue #4 when Ratchet visits the place which debuted in X-Men. The Marvel Universe connections were since jettisoned in later issues of the comic.

Issues # 5-12 - In this story arc, Shockwave has control of the Ark. Most of the Autobots are non-functional, and Optimus Prime has been reduced to just a head. Shockwave wants Optimus Prime to give life to Decepticons using the Creation Matrix that he possesses, but Optimus refuses and eventually passes the Matrix on to an unwitting Buster. Meanwhile, a weakened Megatron tries to regain command of the Decepticons, but Shockwave easily takes him down. Needing help against Shockwave, medical officer Ratchet finds and enlists the help of the Dinobots. Megatron soon winds up lost in the woods, stuck in gun mode and without his memory.

Issues # 13-23 - Megatron is inadvertently reawakened and heads back to become leader of the Decepticons again. Meanwhile, the government hires a comic book writer named Donny Finkelberg to play the Robot Master, a man supposedly behind all the robot attacks (making no distinction between Autobot or Decepticon). The point of the whole ruse is to put an easily identifiable face on the public's worries about the robots. Donny eventually becomes Megatron's pawn for a while, then escapes and tries to help the Autobots - but not before selling them out to the U.S. government. Eventually he realises the error of his ways and gives up all the money that the government paid him.

The Autobots meet more troubles in the form of Circuit Breaker, a character first introduced in issue #8. A sweet and brilliant young lady who created advanced technology for oil magnate Mr. Blackrock, she was crippled during an attack on one of Blackrock's oil rigs in issue #5. Using her technical know-how to create a suit that gives her control of her motor functions again, she adopts the Circuit Breaker persona and vows revenge on all Transformers, also making no distinction between Autobot and Decepticon - and unfortunately, more often than not her actions negatively affect the Autobots alone.

Issues #17 and 18 feature a two-parter that takes the reader back to Cybertron (this was prior to seeing Cybertron in the movie or the TV series). New characters such as Blaster were introduced through this storyline, and the characters eventually crossed over onto Earth.

In issue #19, the Dinobots (especially Grimlock) begin to resent taking orders from Optimus Prime, so they strike out on their own. Omega Supreme is introduced.

Issues # 24-37 - In events that parallel the happenings in the movie and the TV series (though the events take place 20 years apart), many major characters make their final stand. Bumblebee is destroyed by the unwitting members of G.I. Joe in G.I. Joe vs. the Transformers #1; Megatron succeeds in killing Optimus Prime (or does he?) in #24; Megatron is driven mad and runs into a space portal that destroys him in issue #25; etc. Bumblebee soon returns as Goldbug.

A new human adversary named the Mechanic first appears in issue #26, a car thief whose handiness with a wrench can spell disaster for Autobots that get in his path.

The Dinobots return in issue #27 and Grimlock quickly asserts himself as the new leader of the Autobots. Many Autobots have strong reservations about his leadership skills, particularly his lack of concern for human life. Blaster and Goldbug decide to defy orders after one mission and not return to the Ark, making them the subject of hunting by an enraged Grimlock.

Issues #33 and 34 took a break from the main storyline to reprint a Marvel UK Transformers story called "Man of Iron". Since this is outside the normal continuity, Optimus Prime is still alive and the leader of the Autobots at this time.

Starting in issue #35 (cover-dated December, 1987), the events became less Earth-centric, as the Transformers repaired their spacecraft and were able to revisit their homeworld Cybertron and other planets. This aspect was particularly prominent in the Matrix Quest sub-plot.

Starting in issue #38, the Headmasters showed up, after appearing in their own four-issue miniseries. Optimus Prime returned, in a manner of speaking, in issue #40 when it was discovered that his personality had been saved on a floppy disk. Unfortunately, he had no memory of working with the Autobots. However, by issue #42, he had been given a new Powermaster body and his memory had been restored.

In issue #75 (cover-dated February, 1991), the Autobots and Decepticons had united under one banner after Autobot commander Optimus Prime surrendered to Scorponok, in order to end their civil war. United, they finally faced their ancient nemesis: Unicron. The Transformers won, but with heavy losses, including the deaths of Scorponok and Optimus Prime (again). Peace between the two Transformers factions was short-lived after Unicron's death. Bludgeon, the new Decepticon leader, tried to strand the Autobots on Cybertron, which was apparently destroying itself. His plan failed and the final confrontation between the two factions played out, with the Autobots led again by Grimlock. Optimus Prime is united with Hi-Q (his Powermaster) and given life by the Last Autobot. He returns to battle to save the Autobots and then exiles the Decepticons forever (until Transformers: Generation 2). After the battle with Unicron, the comic ran for only five more issues before being cancelled. The final issue had the miniseries banner above the title "#80 IN A FOUR ISSUE LIMITED SERIES".

Writers
Most of the issues of Transformers Marvel US were written by two writers. Although the first issue was written by Bill Mantlo and Ralph Macchio, and the second to the fourth issues were written by Jim Salicrup, editor Bob Budiansky was the one who contributed the most to the story, writing the character bios and backgrounds for the Transformers, even giving names to some of them. After the miniseries became an ongoing comic, Budiansky was promoted to constant writer. Except for issue #16 (Plight of the Bumblebee, written by Len Kaminski), issue #43 (The Big Broadcast of 2006), a Transformers cartoon episode adaptation by Macchio (who also wrote the miniseries adapting the movie) and the two-part story Man of Iron (imported from Transformers Marvel UK), Bob wrote all the Transformers comics until issue #55.

The most famous story arcs and issues are Warrior's School featuring the introduction of the Dinobots and the first clash between Autobot medic Ratchet and Megatron; Prime Time! when Optimus Prime is finally freed from captivity and battles current Decepticon commander Shockwave; Smelting Pool and The Bridge to Nowhere brought the story back to Cybertron where only a handful of Autobots fight an underground war against Straxus's Decepticons, also introducing Blaster, Budiansky's most-used character who was radically different from his cartoon and Marvel UK version. Afterdeath and Gone but not forgotten saw the deaths (for a while, anyway) of Optimus Prime and Megatron, after which Grimlock took control of the Autobot forces in King of the Hill. Starting at issue #28, Blaster and Goldbug (a rebuilt Bumblebee) defected from the Autobots due to Grimlock's tyrannical leadership, which ended with Grimlock and Blaster having a duel in Totaled. The next issue, People Power saw the return of Optimus Prime as a Powermaster. The "Underbase Saga" began in issue #47 and ended in issue #50, Dark Star, where Starscream, absorbing the power of the Underbase, kills most of the active Transformers of the time (Budiansky admitted in an interview that Hasbro was forcing him to introduce new characters so quickly, he had to do an epic to "make room" for them). Budiansky's last five stories were very mediocre; he himself said that he lost the interest in Transformers and asked Hasbro to hand over the comics to a new writer.

From issue #56, the by then well-known writer of Transformers Marvel UK, Simon Furman took over the reins, having been asked by Marvel US. Furman used the characterisation he used at Marvel UK for the Transformers, and introduced many characters to the US comic who had already appeared in the UK comic. He wrote all the issues until the comic's cancellation at issue #80.

Furman's most famous story arcs include Back from the Dead, the return of Megatron who kidnaps Ratchet to help him in his revenge against both Autobots and Decepticons; Primal Scream! which introduced Primus and re-told the origin of the Transformer race to the U.S. readers also; "Matrix Quest" which features the Autobots sending numerous teams to locate the Matrix that was lost when Optimus "died" and his body was shot into space; and the Unicron story arc from #67-75, featuring the Transformers' ultimate battle against the Chaos Bringer.

The comic was cancelled shortly after issue #80, so Furman had to "wrap up" the ending. According to some interviews with him, he planned to feature the Neo-Knights and the "demons" inhabiting Cybertron's underground more in the never-written issues..

UK Title

The U.K. version of the original Transformers comics was produced by Marvel UK (Marvel Comics' semi-independent UK imprint). It began as a simple reprint book with a single U.S. story split across two or more U.K. issues, but differences in production schedules meant that additional locally sourced material was need to pad around the U.S. material. Over 160 new stories not included in the U.S. comic were produced for the U.K. market. They introduced characters such as Emirate Xaaron, and operated an expanded continuity parallel to the main U.S. franchise. Classic storylines included Galvatron time-travelling in Target: 2006 and the introduction of the Transformer God, Primus.

Initially, the U.K. exclusive stories were heavily tied into U.S. continuity and were not able to develop the characters. However, the release of the Transformers animated movie introduced a new generation of future characters (Hot Rod, Ultra Magnus, Galvatron, etc.) who were generally ignored by the U.S. title and could be developed by the U.K. title without contradicting the U.S. reprints.

The principal writer of the U.K. material was Simon Furman. Many of his longer stories took a more epic approach to the Transformers than the U.S. title. The U.K. comic extensively developed the backstory world of the Transformers. Furman's epic semi-mythical and more sophisticated approach to the material had a significant impact on future Transformer imprints. His success on the title was such that he succeeded Bob Budiansky as writer of the U.S. counterpart and has been associated with the succession of Transformers comic franchises, such as published by Dreamwave and IDW.

The Transformers U.K. comic was equally home to two long-standing backup humour strips. The first was Robo-Capers, written and produced by artist/creator Lew Stringer. The second was Matt and the Cat, written and produced by artist/creator Mychailo "Mike" Kazybrid. Whilst originally created as the daily cartoon strip Matt in April 1979, and appearing for six years in the Bradford Telegraph & Argus newspaper and later in The Manchester Evening News, the comic strip began in Transformers issue #5 (November 1984) and continued until issue #73 (August 1986). In order to fit in with the theme of the Transformers publication, the format and style was changed. Also, whilst starting as mainly a supporting character, Humph the Cat began to take more of a lead during his humorous encounters with robots, aliens, and his ongoing need to post his comic book subscription.

Other titles
There were two four-issue miniseries, G.I. Joe and the Transformers, and The Transformers: Headmasters, which integrated into the story of the main title. The G.I. Joe comic book series would also later introduce the 12-issue follow-up, Generation 2.

The Transformers: Regeneration One
In July 2011, it was announced that IDW Publishing has signed up Simon Furman, Andrew Wildman and Stephen Baskerville (Wildman's Transformers inker) to make a continuation of the Marvel Transformers comic, consisting of 20 issues from #81 to #100, titled The Transformers: Regeneration One. A special "prequel" issue, numbered #80.5, was published on Free Comic Book Day on 5 May 2012. Issue number #81 was published in July 2012, after which the series continued monthly. It wraps up plot points left hanging after the US edition was cancelled (as Furman's other attempts at doing this were labelled non-canon).

Characters

Notes

References

 
 

Marvel Entertainment franchises
1984 comics debuts
1991 comics endings
Marvel Comics titles
Marvel UK titles
Transformers comics
Marvel Comics
Marvel Comics robots
Comics set in the United States